Vidya Dhar Bajpai is an Indian politician. He was elected to the Lok Sabha, lower house of the Parliament of India from Amethi, Uttar Pradesh as a member of the Indian National Congress.

References

India MPs 1971–1977
India MPs 1967–1970
Lok Sabha members from Uttar Pradesh
Indian National Congress politicians
Possibly living people
Year of birth missing